Lone Star Moonlight is a 1946 American Western film directed by Ray Nazarro and written by Louise Rousseau. The film stars Ken Curtis, Joan Barton, Guy Kibbee, Robert Kellard, Claudia Drake and Arthur Loft. It was released on December 12, 1946 by Columbia Pictures.

Plot

Cast          
Ken Curtis as Curt Norton
Joan Barton as Jean White
Guy Kibbee as Amos Norton
Robert Kellard as Eddie Jackson
Claudia Drake as Mimi Carston
Arthur Loft as Thaddeus White
Vernon Dent as Sheriff
Sam Flint as Jim Mahoney
Ken Trietsch as Hoosier Hotshot Ken 
Paul Trietsch as Hoosier Hotshot Hezzie
Gil Taylor as Hoosier Hotshot Gil
Charles Ward as Hoosier Hotshot Gabe 
Merle Travis as Merle Travis
Judy Clark as Judy Clark

References

External links
 

1946 films
1940s English-language films
American Western (genre) films
1946 Western (genre) films
Columbia Pictures films
Films directed by Ray Nazarro
American black-and-white films
1940s American films